The Indianapolis Fire Department (IFD) provides fire and rescue protection and emergency medical services to the city of Indianapolis, Indiana. In total the department serves .

History
The first fire department in Indianapolis was not founded until June 20, 1826. It was a volunteer department that had to use a church bell for alarms, and had only ladders and leather buckets to fight fires. This was seventeen months after the first recorded fire in Indianapolis occurred on January 17, 1825, which took place in a tavern across the street from the county courthouse.

In 1835, a law was passed requiring the purchase of an engine, along with better equipment, to be partially funded by the state and partially by the city, in order to protect the Indiana Statehouse. From this, the Marion Fire, Hose, and Protection Company was established. An additional volunteer company was founded in 1841 and there were eight total volunteer companies in Indianapolis by 1859. Collectively, 600 men were volunteers in these eight companies, and although unpaid, they did receive perks such as immunity from being called on juries or militia duty, and not having to pay poll taxes or taxes for roads.

The volunteer companies were rather political, and tended to express their views freely. They were also known to break into brothels and freely use their hoses on the clientele and the interior walls, wrecking the places; this was done not for moral reasons, but rather, to amuse themselves. As a result, Mayor Samuel D. Maxwell and the Indianapolis City Council established a paid force on November 14, 1859, so that the council could have control over Indianapolis' fire protection, which it did not have over the volunteers. Maxwell was considered the father of the Indianapolis Fire Force and faced only slight criticism for the idea, although it was not widely popular at this time with the former volunteers. The Indianapolis Fire Department began with a hook and ladder company and two hand engines, but would in 1860 gain their first steam engine.

The paid firemen had no days off, were not allowed to leave their post except for one meal, and were seldom allowed to leave the firehouse unless on fire business or a family emergency. An ordinance in 1859 made it illegal to give firemen alcoholic beverages. Their clothes were irregular; uniforms were not worn until 1874, with a regulation uniform established in 1928. Firemen had to buy their own uniforms until 1943, when a $60 clothing allowance was established. An attempt to remove politics from the fire department was not very successful; it was necessary to mandate that the department staff be half Republican and half Democrat, and the role of fire chief was based on political affiliation and family contacts.

The first dog to discover arson for the Indianapolis Fire Department was acquired in July 1993.

Mergers with township fire departments
Since 2007, several the fire departments in the eight townships in Marion County other than Center Township that were not previously part of the IFD coverage area have been absorbed by IFD. , five of the eight township fire departments have merged with IFD:

Washington Township, January 2007
Warren Township, July 2007
Perry Township, August 2009
Franklin Township, July 2010
Lawrence Township, January 2011

The three townships retaining their own fire departments  are all on the west side of Marion County.

Decatur Township
Pike Township
Wayne Township
In July 2021, the city council of Beech Grove began consideration of an interlocal agreement under which IFD would provide fire protection services for the next 20 years. Current Beech Grove firefighters would become members of IFD.

Operations
There are currently fourteen Divisions of Operations within the Indianapolis Fire Department: Communications, Emergency Operations, Emergency Medical Services, Executive Services, Finance and Pension, Fire Investigations Section, Fire and Life Safety, Homeland Security/Special Operations and Training, Quartermaster, Information Technology, Media Relations, Safety, Support Services, and USAR Indiana Task Force One. There are 7 Battalions under the command of a Battalion Chief. The International Association of Firefighters (IAFF) Local is 416.

USAR Task Force 1 
The Indianapolis Fire Department is the founding member of one of the 28 FEMA Urban Search and Rescue Task Force. Indiana Task Force 1 (IN-TF1) is made up of members of multiple fire departments in Marion County.

Indianapolis EMS
911 Ambulance services in the city of Indianapolis are provided by Indianapolis Emergency Medical Services (IEMS), a division of the Health and Hospital Corporation of Marion County. In 2010, the Indianapolis Fire Department decided to discontinue the operation of the transporting ambulance assets acquired from the consolidation of Washington, Lawrence, and Franklin Township fire departments into IFD. Wishard Ambulance Service absorbed the civilian staff released from the decommissioned IFD ambulances and in December 2010, the newly enlarged Wishard Ambulance Service was rebranded as Indianapolis Emergency Medical Services.  IEMS operates 42 ambulances, with 32 of them deployed during peak hours. Fourteen of these ambulances are co-located at IFD fire stations. While IEMS is not a part of the Indianapolis Fire Department, the two agencies work closely together in daily operations and long term EMS system planning. IEMS also provides educational and logistical support to IFD's EMS operations. Members of IEMS may choose to join the IAFF Union 416.

Stations and apparatus

Notable incidents

Ramada Inn Air Crash and Fire 

The Ramada Inn Air Crash and Fire was an aircraft accident that occurred at the Airport Ramada Inn in Indianapolis, Indiana when a United States Air Force pilot failed to reach the runway and the plane crashed into a nearby Ramada Inn. The pilot survived after ejecting but 9 people were killed in the hotel when the aircraft smashed into the side of the building.

References

Fire Department
Fire departments in Indiana
1859 establishments in Indiana